Mionnay station (French: Gare de Mionnay) is a French railway station located in the commune of Mionnay, Ain department in the Auvergne-Rhône-Alpes region. It is located at kilometric point (KP) 23.441 on the Lyon–Bourg-en-Bresse railway, between Les Échets and Saint-André-de-Corcy stations.

As of 2020, the station is owned and operated by the SNCF and served by TER Auvergne-Rhône-Alpes trains.

History 
The station is located on a portion of railway which is double-tracked between Les Échets at KP 19.334 and Villars-les-Dombes station.

In 2019, the SNCF estimated that 98,182 passengers traveled through the station.

Services

Passenger services 
Classified as a PANG (point d'accès non géré), the station is unstaffed and equipped with automatic ticket dispensers.

Train services 
As of 2021, the station is served by the following services:

 Regional Services (TER Auvergne-Rhône-Alpes 32)  Bourg-en-Bresse ... Lyon.

Intermodality 
In addition to a parking lot for passengers, the station is equipped with secure bicycle storage facilities.

References 

Railway stations in Ain